Rho Aquarii, Latinized from ρ Aquarii, is the Bayer designation for a binary star system in the equatorial constellation of Aquarius. It is visible to the naked eye with an apparent visual magnitude of +5.34. It is drifting closer with a radial velocity of –9 km/s. The proximity of this star to the ecliptic means it is subject to lunar occultations.

This is a single-lined spectroscopic binary, with the presence of a companion being revealed by Doppler shifts in the spectrum. An initial orbital solution for the data gives an orbital period of 220.4 days. It is a candidate mercury-manganese star, showing a surfeit of these elements in the spectrum. With five times the Sun's mass, this star is radiating 1,035 times as much luminosity from its outer atmosphere at an effective temperature of 12,593 K. This heat gives it the blue-white hue of a B-type star. The companion may be a variable star.

References

External links
 HR 8512 
 Image Rho Aquarii 
 Aladin sky atlas, image 

B-type giants
Mercury-manganese stars
Spectroscopic binaries
Variable stars

Aquarius (constellation)
Aquarii, Rho
BD-08 5855
Aquarii, 046
211838
110273
8512